Michal Ajvaz (born 30 October 1949 in Prague) is a Czech novelist, poet and translator, an exponent of the literary style known as magic realism.

Biography 
Born into a family of Russian exiles, Ajvaz studied Czech studies and aesthetics at Charles University in Prague.  He currently works as a researcher at Prague's Centre for Theoretical Studies and, in addition to fiction, has published an essay on Derrida and a book-length meditation on Borges. His novel Prázdné ulice was awarded the Jaroslav Seifert Prize for literary achievement (2005), the most prestigious literary award in the Czech Republic. He won the Magnesia Litera 2012 award (book of the year) for his novel Lucemburská zahrada and the 2020 Czech State Award for Literature for his body of work to-date.

Bibliography 
This incomplete list gives the titles of Ajvaz's works.

 1989 – Vražda v hotelu Intercontinental (Murder in the Intercontinental Hotel; poems)
 1991 – Návrat starého varana (Return of the Old Komodo Dragon; stories)
 1993 – Druhé město (The Other City; novel)
 1994 – Znak a bytí: Úvahy nad Derridovou gramatologií (Sign and Being: Reflections on Derrida's Grammatology)
 1997 – Tyrkysový orel (Turquoise Eagle; 2 short novels)
 1997 – Tajemství knihy (Secret of the Book; essays)
 2001 – Zlatý věk (The Golden Age; novel)
 2003 – Světelný prales: Úvahy o vidění (The Luminous Primeval Forest: Essays on Seeing)
 2003 – Sny gramatik, záře písmen. Setkání s Jorgem Luisem Borgesem (Dreams of Grammars, Shine of Letters. Meeting with Jorge Luis Borges)
 2004 – Prázdné ulice (Empty Streets; novel)
 2006 – Příběh znaků a prázdna (Story of Signs and Emptiness; essays)
 2006 – Padesát pět měst (55 Cities)
 2007 – L'autre île (French translation of Zlatý věk)
 2008 – Cesta na jih (Voyage to the South; novel)
 2009 – The Other City (English translation)
 2010 – The Golden Age (English translation)
 2011 – Lucemburská zahrada (Luxembourg Gardens; novel)
 2016 – Empty Streets (English translation)
 2019 – Města (Cities; novel)

See also

 List of Czech writers

References

External links 
 Jonathan Bolton's essay on "Reading Michal Ajvaz" in CONTEXT.
 Translation of prose piece from Padesát pět měst (in The Cafe Irreal)
 Author profile in English on czechlit.cz
 Michal Ajvaz: An annotated bibliography (of sorts, and with a brief commentary)

1949 births
Living people
Czech novelists
Male novelists
Czech male poets
Charles University alumni
Magic realism writers
Magnesia Litera winners
Czech people of Russian descent
Writers from Prague
Weird fiction writers